APT Bulletin is a quarterly peer-reviewed academic journal published by the Association for Preservation Technology International. It is currently edited by Diana S. Waite (Mount Ida Press) with the assistance of various guest editors. The content of APT Bulletin consists primarily of articles about the practice and technology of historic preservation, but essays and book reviews are also included.

History
The journal began publication in 1969 as the Newsletter of the Association for Preservation Technology (1969), changing its name that same year to the Bulletin of the Association for Preservation Technology. The journal's title was shortened to the current APT Bulletin, starting with Volume 18 in 1986. Publication is typically quarterly, although there have been several double issues.

Guest-edited special issues of APT Bulletin have included articles on the following themes: the U.S. National Park Service (1978 and 1984), Parks Canada (1986), Guastavino tile vaults (1999), covered bridges (2004), modern heritage (2011), and many others.

References

External links 

Quarterly journals
English-language journals
Historic preservation
Publications established in 1969
Academic journals published by learned and professional societies